The 2021–22 West of Scotland Football League (known as the PDM Buildbase West of Scotland League for sponsorship reasons) was the 2nd season of the West of Scotland Football League, with its top division as part of the sixth tier of the Scottish football pyramid system. The season began on 17 July 2021.

Teams

To West of Scotland Football League
 BSC Glasgow
 Campbeltown Pupils
 Finnart
 Glenvale
 Harmony Row
 Kilsyth Athletic
 St. Peter's

Transferred from East Premiership South
 Harthill Royal

From West of Scotland Football League
In Abeyance
 Annbank United

Premier Division

The Premier Division remained with the same 20 clubs as before, after the 2020–21 season was declared null and void. This would be reduced to 16 clubs for the 2022–23 season as 7 clubs were relegated.

Darvel won the title with one round of fixtures to play on 7 May 2022, with a 3–2 home victory over Kilwinning Rangers. However they were unsuccessful in their attempt to gain promotion to the Lowland League, finishing second to Tranent Juniors in the Lowland League play-off.

Stadia and locations

Notes

League table

Results

Tier 7
The Conferences reverted back to their original lineup at the start of the 2020–21 season, after it was declared null and void. The winners of each Conference were promoted to the Premier Division for the 2022–23 season, and positions 2 to 4 became part of a 16-team First Division alongside the seven relegated clubs. Positions 5 to 9 in each Conference plus the best 10th place club made up the Second Division, with the remaining clubs forming a Third Division in 2022–23.

Conference A

Stadia and locations

Notes

League table

Results

Conference B

Stadia and locations

Notes

League table

Results

Conference C

Stadia and locations

League table

Results

Division Four

Division Four contained eight new clubs accepted for the 2021–22 season. Westerton United withdrew before the season began.

Stadia and locations

Notes

League table

Results

Notes
 Club with an SFA Licence eligible to participate in the Lowland League promotion play-off should they win the Premier Division.

References

External links

6
 
SCO